Lithuanian Braille is the braille alphabet of the Lithuanian language.

Alphabet
The alphabet is as follows: 

Most of the print letters with accents are derived in Lithuanian braille by adding a dot 6 to the base letter, and those which already have a dot 6 through inversion (cf. Czech Braille, Esperanto Braille). Ū uses the international convention for a second u. Ž is unusual, but perhaps forms a set with s, š, z (cf. Hungarian Braille). 

Several of these conventions are used in Polish Braille.

Punctuation

Source:

Formatting

References

 Visuotinė lietuvių enciklopedija. Vilnius, 2001

French-ordered braille alphabets
Lithuanian language